Robin Evan Roberts (September 30, 1926 – May 6, 2010) was a Major League Baseball starting pitcher who pitched primarily for the Philadelphia Phillies (1948–1961). He spent the latter part of his career with the Baltimore Orioles (1962–1965), Houston Astros (1965–66), and Chicago Cubs (1966). He was inducted into the Baseball Hall of Fame in  1976. After his playing days, he coached the NCAA's South Florida Bulls baseball team for nine seasons, leading them to 6 conference titles.

Early life
Roberts was born in Springfield, Illinois, the son of an immigrant Welsh coal miner. He arrived in East Lansing, Michigan as part of an Army Air Corps training program. He attended Lanphier High School and after World War II, Roberts returned to Michigan State College to play basketball, not baseball. Roberts led the Spartans' basketball team in field-goal percentage in 1946–1947, was captain of the team during the 1946–1947 and 1949–1950 seasons, and earned three varsity letters in basketball. He wore number 17 for the Spartans. After his second season playing basketball, Roberts tried out for the Michigan State baseball team, becoming a pitcher because it was the position that coach John Kobs needed most. After playing for Michigan State and spending his second summer playing in Vermont with the Barre–Montpelier Twin City Trojans, he was signed by the Phillies.

Professional career

Philadelphia Phillies
Roberts made his major league debut on June 18, 1948, and in 1950 he led his Phillies—whose overall youth earned them the nickname the Whiz Kids—to their first National League pennant in 35 years. Roberts started three games in the last five days of the season, defeating the heavily favored Brooklyn Dodgers at Ebbets Field, in a pennant-deciding, season-ending, 10-inning game. This marked his 20th victory of the season, and Roberts became the Phillies' first 20-game winner since Grover Cleveland Alexander in 1917.  Roberts also started Game 2 in the 1950 World Series against Allie Reynolds. He allowed two runs in ten hits in ten innings as the Phillies lost 2-1.

From 1950 to 1955 inclusive, Roberts won at least 20 games each season, leading the NL in victories from 1952 to 1955. Six times he led the league in games started, five times in complete games and innings pitched, and he once pitched 28 complete games in a row, with one game being 17 innings. During his career, Roberts never walked more than 77 batters in any regular season. He helped himself with his bat, hitting 55 doubles, 10 triples, and five home runs with 103 RBIs.

His 28 wins in 1952, the year he won The Sporting News Player of the Year Award, were the most in the National League since 1935, the year when Dizzy Dean won 28 games.

Although he had 28 wins in 1952, Roberts had his best season, based on a career high WAR (wins above replacement) in 1953, posting a 23–16 record and leading the NL pitchers in strikeouts with 198. In a career-high  innings pitched, he walked just 66 batters, and his 2.75 ERA was second in the league behind Warren Spahn's 2.10.

One of the most memorable highlights of his career occurred on May 13, 1954, when Roberts gave up a lead-off home run to the Cincinnati Reds' (then known as the Redlegs) Bobby Adams and then he retired 27 consecutive batters to win 8–1, on a one-hit game.

Roberts consistently (11 out of 14 years) had a better winning percentage than did the Phillies in games in which he had no decision. Overall, the Phillies were 1,020–1,136 from 1948 to 1961, a winning percentage of .4731. Roberts was 234–199 in that span, for a winning percentage of .5404.

Later career

After the 1961 season, Roberts was sold to the New York Yankees, who acquired the slumping pitcher from the Phillies for slightly more than the $20,000 league waiver price. On February 6, 1962, the Phillies announced that Roberts's uniform number 36 would be retired by the team on March 21, 1962, when the Yankees would visit Clearwater to play the Phillies in a spring training game. It was the first uniform number to be retired by the organization. Roberts started for the Yankees in the spring game, gave up four runs in three innings, and was the winning pitcher in the Yankees' 13–10 victory. He was released by the Yankees in May 1962 without having appeared in a regular-season game for the Yankees.

He signed with the Baltimore Orioles on May 21, 1962. He went 42–36 with a 3.09 ERA in  seasons with the Orioles. In his final year in Baltimore, he was the first road roommate and mentor to Jim Palmer, who made his major league debut in relief of Roberts in the third inning of a 12–9 loss to the Boston Red Sox in Fenway Park on April 17, 1965. Palmer said 47 years later, "Robin Roberts helped teach me even though he knew I was probably going to take his job." Dissatisfied with his new role as a spot starter and long reliever, Roberts requested his release, which was granted by the Orioles on July 27, 1965.

Roberts signed with the Houston Astros on August 5. He signed with the Chicago Cubs on July 13, 1966, with the additional capacity of assisting pitching coach Freddie Fitzsimmons. Roberts was also reunited with fellow Whiz Kid Curt Simmons. His final major league game was with the Cubs on September 3, 1966, at Forbes Field. He was released by the Cubs on October 3, 1966. He pitched for the Reading Phillies during 1967.

Roberts was elected to the Baseball Hall of Fame in 1976. Ahead of the August 1976 induction, Roberts was named honorary captain of the National League for the 1976 Major League Baseball All-Star Game, which was hosted by the Phillies at Veterans Stadium.

Post-playing career
After one season (1976) as a color commentator on Phillies broadcasts, Roberts coached the University of South Florida Bulls baseball team from 1977–1985. He led the team to its first NCAA Tournament in 1982, and won six conference titles with the Bulls. His uniform number 36 was the first to be retired by the team and was honored on the center field wall at USF's now-demolished Red McEwen Field; and is honored on the new USF Baseball Stadium as well.

During the baseball off–season, Roberts toured with the Robin Roberts All–Stars basketball team. The team played against other touring squads, such as the Harlem Globetrotters.

Roberts was also the president of the Gold King Seafood Company in Philadelphia, even during his baseball career. This was central to an appearance Roberts made on What's My Line? in 1957, where the panelists had to decipher what else he did besides play baseball.

Legacy

In his 19-season career, Roberts compiled a 286–245 record with 2,357 strikeouts, a 3.41 ERA, 305 complete games, 45 shutouts, and  innings pitched in 676 games. He is second to Jamie Moyer for the major league record for home runs allowed by a pitcher (505) and holds the record for most consecutive opening day starts for the same team with 12, from 1950 to 1961.

As a hitter, Roberts posted a .167 batting average (255-for-1525) with 107 runs, 55 doubles, 10 triples, 5 home runs, 103 RBI and 135 bases on balls. Defensively, he recorded a .967 fielding percentage.

Roberts is the only pitcher in major league history to defeat the Braves franchise in all three cities that the team has been based in: Boston, Milwaukee, and Atlanta.

Roberts's record for home runs allowed can largely be attributed to his durability and his tendency to pitch inside the strike zone. Roberts threw  innings during his 19-year career, 21st on the all-time innings pitched list. Moreover, Roberts challenged hitters to put the ball in play, issuing relatively few walks (1.7 per 9 innings pitched) and strikeouts (4.5 per 9 innings pitched).

In 1962, the Philadelphia Phillies honored Roberts with the retirement of his uniform number, 36.

In 1966, Roberts was inducted into the Pennsylvania Sports Hall of Fame.

In 1969, in conjunction with Major League Baseball's celebration of the 100th anniversary of professional baseball, the Phillies conducted a fan vote to determine the Phillies all-time team. On August 5, 1969, at Connie Mack Stadium, the Phillies honored the members of the all-time team, including Roberts as the only right-handed pitcher. He was also honored as the greatest Phillies player of all time.

In 1978, the Philadelphia Phillies inducted Roberts as the first Phillie in the Philadelphia Baseball Wall of Fame (along with Connie Mack as the first Athletics player in the Wall of Fame).

In 1983—the 100th anniversary of the founding of the Phillies—Roberts was selected as one of only two right-handed pitchers on the Phillies Centennial Team.

In 1985 during Roberts' last game as coach of the South Florida Bulls baseball team, USF retired his number 36

In 1992, Roberts was one of 30 members of the charter class of former Michigan State University Spartan athletes, coaches, and administrators inducted into the MSU Athletics Hall of Fame.

In 1998, the Wilmington Blue Rocks retired Roberts's No. 36 at the Carolina League All-Star game held at the Blue Rocks' Frawley Stadium.  He was the first former player to ever have his number retired by the team.

In 1999, he ranked No. 74 on The Sporting News''' list of the 100 Greatest Baseball Players, and was a nominee for the Major League Baseball All-Century Team.

On July 21, 2003, Roberts returned to Montpelier, Vermont, to accept two honors: The Vermont Mountaineers retired his number from his playing days with the Barre-Montpelier Twin City Trojans, and Governor Jim Douglas presented him a proclamation that made the day "Robin Roberts Day" in the State of Vermont.

On April 3, 2004, the Phillies new ballpark, Citizens Bank Park, officially opened, with a statue of Roberts outside the first-base gate.

Also in 2004, Roberts was a member of the inaugural class inducted into the Philadelphia Sports Hall of Fame.

In Roberts's home town of Springfield, Illinois, Robin Roberts Stadium is named for the former ballplayer.

Roberts was an outspoken critic of Little League baseball.  His remarks on the organization appeared in a 1975 Newsweek article titled "Strike Out Little League".

In 2013, the Bob Feller Act of Valor Award honored Roberts as one of 37 Baseball Hall of Fame members for his service in the United States Army Air Force during World War II.

Death

He died of natural causes on May 6, 2010, at his home in Temple Terrace, Florida. For the remainder of their 2010 season, the Philadelphia Phillies wore a commemorative #36 patch on their uniforms and hung a Robin Roberts jersey in their dugout during home and away games.

Career statistics
Seven-time All-Star (1950–1956)
Five-time top 10 in MVP voting (1950, 1952–1955)
Six-time 20+ game winner (1950–1955)
Four-time win champion (1952–1955)
Twice led the league in strikeouts (1953–54)
Led league in shutouts (1950)
Six-time league leader in games started (1950–1955)
Five-time league leader in complete games (1952–1956)
Five-time leaguer leader in innings pitched (1951–1955)
Pitched 300+ innings six times (1950–1955)
Ranks 28th on the all-time wins leaderboard
Second-most home runs allowed by a pitcher, with 505
Holds five Philadelphia Phillies team records as of 2010: most complete games pitched, most games pitched, most innings pitched, most hits allowed, and most losses

Career as author
Roberts wrote two books about his baseball experiences: The Whiz Kids and the 1950 Pennant (1996), and My Life in Baseball'' (2003), both with C. Paul Rogers, III, a law professor at Southern Methodist University.

See also

List of Major League Baseball career strikeout leaders
List of Major League Baseball career wins leaders
List of Major League Baseball annual ERA leaders
List of Major League Baseball annual strikeout leaders
List of Major League Baseball annual wins leaders
List of Major League Baseball pitchers who have thrown an immaculate inning
List of Sporting News Player of the Year
List of Sporting News Pitcher of the Year

References

Further reading

External links

Robin Roberts at SABR (Baseball BioProject)
Robin Roberts at Baseball Almanac
Robin Roberts at Baseball Biography
Robin Roberts at The Baseball Page
History: Tributes: Robin Roberts / 1926–2010. MLB.com.

1926 births
2010 deaths
American people of Welsh descent
Baltimore Orioles players
Baseball players from Illinois
Chicago Cubs players
Houston Astros coaches
Houston Astros players
Major League Baseball broadcasters
Major League Baseball pitchers
Major League Baseball players with retired numbers
Michigan State Spartans baseball players
Michigan State Spartans men's basketball players
National Baseball Hall of Fame inductees
National League All-Stars
National League strikeout champions
National League wins champions
People from Temple Terrace, Florida
Philadelphia Phillies announcers
Philadelphia Phillies players
Reading Phillies players
South Florida Bulls baseball coaches
Sportspeople from Springfield, Illinois
United States Army Air Forces personnel of World War II
Wilmington Blue Rocks (1940–1952) players
American men's basketball players